La'Sean Pickstock (born 4 August 1989) is a male sprinter from Nassau, Bahamas, who mainly competed in the 400m. He ran second leg of the 4x400 relay at the 2010 IAAF World Indoor Championships in Athletics in Doha, Qatar and first leg of the 4 × 400 m relay at the 2010 Commonwealth Games that placed fourth in the final. He ran the anchor leg of the 4 x 400m Relay at the NACAC U23 Championships in Athletics where the Bahamas won the silver medal in the final. He attended CR.Walker High School in the Bahamas before joining countryman and Olympic gold medalist Ramon Miller at Dickinson State University where he was an All American. He now works for the Dickinson Police Department in Dickinson, North Dakota.

Personal bests

References

External links
 Athletics.net
 World Athletics

1989 births
Living people
Bahamian male sprinters
Central American and Caribbean Games silver medalists for the Bahamas
Competitors at the 2010 Central American and Caribbean Games
Central American and Caribbean Games medalists in athletics
Athletes (track and field) at the 2010 Commonwealth Games
Commonwealth Games competitors for the Bahamas
Dickinson State University alumni